The Vicksburg Area Transit System, marketed as the N-Route, is the primary provider of mass transportation in Warren County, Mississippi. Four routes provide weekday service. In honor of the region's blues musical heritage, buses entertain riders by playing classic songs of this style while en route.

Routes
1 Kings/Casino
2 River Region/Vicksburg Mall
3 Clay Street - North/South
 Trolley Route

References
N-Route

Bus transportation in Mississippi